Torino Olympic Park is the park that was created to manage all of the facilities used for the 2006 Winter Olympics in Turin, Italy, and facilities surrounding the Turin region.

Facilities and locations included:

 Bardonecchia (snowboarding)
 Cesana Pariol (bobsleigh, luge, and skeleton)
 Cesana San Sicario (alpine skiing and biathlon)
 Oval Lingotto (speed skating)
 Palasport Olimpico (ice hockey)
 Palavela (figure skating and short track speed skating)
 Pinerolo (curling)
 Pragelato (cross-country skiing, Nordic combined, and ski jumping)
 Sauze d'Oulx (freestyle skiing)
 Sestriere (alpine skiing)
 Stadio Olimpico (opening and closing ceremonies)
 Torino Esposizioni (ice hockey).

References
Official website 

Venues of the 2006 Winter Olympics
Sports venues in Turin
Olympic Parks